The ninth season of Smallville, an American television series, began airing on September 25, 2009. The series recounts the early adventures of Kryptonian Clark Kent as he adjusts to life in the fictional town of Smallville, Kansas, during the years before he becomes Superman. The ninth season comprises 21 episodes and concluded its initial airing on May 14, 2010, marking the fourth season to air on The CW television network. After four seasons broadcasting on Thursday nights at 8:00 pm, Smallville was moved to Friday nights at 8:00 pm for season nine, to make room for The Vampire Diaries.

This season Clark takes his superhero persona into obsessive territory when he leaves behind those he cares for so that he can focus solely on Jor-El's training. In order to accomplish this, Clark wears a new costume that sports his family crest on the chest. The theme of the season is about Clark finally embracing his alien heritage, while also being his darkest hour thus far. As a result, Clark's relationships with Chloe and Oliver suffered this season. Season nine also saw the introduction of more DC Comics characters, including multiple episode appearances for the Justice Society of America, as well as villain Metallo, and government agent Amanda Waller and an appearance by the Wonder Twins.

Following the end of season eight, Aaron Ashmore and Sam Witwer departed the series after both their characters were killed off. Regular cast members during season nine include Tom Welling, Allison Mack, Erica Durance, Cassidy Freeman, Justin Hartley, and Callum Blue. With the loss of two series regulars, producers had to look for a new primary villain for season nine. Executive producers Kelly Souders and Brian Peterson decided to use Zod, a character from the comics and Christopher Reeve Superman films. This version of Zod is younger than previous incarnations, including the short appearance he had on Smallville in season six, and goes by the title of "Major Zod". Original depictions list the character as "General Zod".

The season premiere brought in 2.58 million viewers and outperformed any other show in the Friday 8:00 pm timeslot in over a year. Furthermore, "Absolute Justice", a two-hour episode featuring the Justice Society of America, aired on February 5, 2010. In an effort to clear up confusion, the Smallville writers announced on their Twitter page that they still consider the two-hour episode to be two separately produced episodes, but was aired and packaged on the season nine DVD as a single episode. Season nine averaged 2.38 million viewers, ranking #129 out of the 140 broadcast primetime shows.

Episodes

Production

Writing
In an interview, Justin Hartley revealed that season nine would partially deal with Oliver having to battle his personal demons: "I think he is going to struggle with the things he has been afforded (as a result of) his powers. He has sacrificed things and done things that haunt him... It’s bad stuff. We need to get to the bottom of it." Peterson stated that season would see Clark taking his "Red-Blue Blur" persona into obsessive territory: "He is trying a little too hard to be a hero, and is leaving the rest of his life behind." Entertainment Weekly'''s Michael Ausiello revealed that this season would feature major developments to the Clark/Lois relationship, but also that Superman's "iconic 'S'" would be featured significantly throughout the season, including on Clark's chest. After an interview with Peterson, Ausiello stated that the theme for season nine revolved around "Clark's darkest hour"; there will be a love-triangle between Clark, Lois, and the Red-Blue Blur that will last for the season; tension will build between Chloe and Clark as the former realizes she is not satisfied just being a "sidekick"; and that the creative team is not "story-wise, approaching this season as Smallvilles last". A scene between Clark and Jor-El has been constructed for the premiere to explain why Clark has not learned to fly. Clark and Oliver's friendship also became tense thanks to Oliver's growing interest in rekindling his romantic relationship with Lois, Zod would bring multiple Kryptonians to Earth with him, and Jor-El would make a physical appearance on the show.

In an interview following the 2009 San Diego Comic-Con International panel for Smallville, Souders and Peterson revealed that Clark would be training to take one-step closer to his ultimate destiny as Superman, and that Clark would be wearing a costume while performing his Red-Blue Blur duties. The pair explained that this season's theme is also about Clark "embracing the fact that he is an alien". That said, Souders has stated that she would not refer to Clark himself as "darker", because he is still "the Superman underneath it all that we all know and love". E! Online's Natalie Abrams revealed, following the Smallville panel, that Clark's suit would be black, with a silver Superman "S" on the front, as well a trench coat that doubles as a cape. Based on the information released at the panel, Abrams reports that the producers had a series finale prepared should this season be the last. Although it was initially stated that Tom Welling would direct two episodes, because of his responsibilities producing the new series Hellcats, he only directed one. Allison Mack will be directing one.

Characters
Making return appearances this season are Toyman, who last appeared in season eight's episode "Requiem", along with another appearance from Martian Manhunter. On November 6, 2009, it was reported that Serinda Swan would return as Zatanna for an early 2010 episode, titled "Warrior". The characters Victor Stone and Dinah Lance are set to return for the season finale; Victor Stone has not been seen since the season six episode "Justice", and Dinah Lance has not made an appearance since the season eight finale.

Callum Blue was also cast in the series regular role of Zod. His character was first mentioned in season five, when Brainiac used Lex Luthor's body as a physical vessel for Zod's spirit to inhabit. In an interview, Peterson and executive producer Kelly Souders explained that this version of Zod will be different from the one who appeared in prior seasons. The execs classify this incarnation as "Major Zod", as opposed to his typical "General Zod" identifier and reveal that throughout season nine "the venomous side of Zod rises because he experiences a few key betrayals with our beloved characters". Zod will also be accompanied by Kryptonians Faora, his wife in the comics, and Basqat. On September 11, 2009, it was announced that Julian Sands was cast as Jor-El for the seventh episode of season nine, "Kandor". Until now, Jor-El has been a disembodied voice emanating from Clark's ship in season two, the Kawatche cave walls in season three and four, and then the Fortress of Solitude from season five onward. Annette O'Toole and Michael McKean will return to reprise their roles as Martha Kent and Perry White, respectively. O'Toole has not made an appearance since the season six finale, when her character left for the United States Senate, and McKean has not appeared since his first guest spot in season three. Both actors will appear in the penultimate episode of the season. Executive producer Brian Peterson reveals that White's reintroduction into the series will show him moving closer to his destiny as the Editor-in-Chief of the Daily Planet, as well as his first meeting with Lois Lane, while Martha and Clark's reunion will have an "unexpected surprise".

Brian Austin Green was cast to portray Metallo for the first two episodes of this season, and made a third appearance in the seventeenth episode in the spring 2010. The executive producers also brought in DC Comics character Roulette, portrayed by Steph Song, In an interview Song revealed that she reviewed the character's comic book backstory beforehand, but that she wanted to make it known that the character has her own agenda in the episode. Clarifying, even though Roulette is sent after Oliver by someone else, she always stays "five steps ahead of everyone else". Roulette's famous tattoo, a dragon going up her leg and wrapping around her torso, will appear in the episode. Song stated that she spent three days in testing, where the creative team drew the tattoo onto her body and then took pictures of how it appeared before making a transfer with color. In addition, there will also be first appearances by the Wonder Twins and Green Arrow's sidekick Speedy. Peterson revealed that Smallvilles version of Speedy will be the most recent incarnation, Mia Dearden, and is HIV-positive just like her comic book counterpart. Souders explains, "She has a sordid past and crosses paths with Oliver [Green Arrow] in some shady places [...] But he gives her hope." The Wonder Twins, who first appeared in the Super Friends Saturday morning cartoons, will have their traditional abilities of being able to transform into various forms of water and animal life; there will also be a glimpse of the twins' blue monkey Gleek.

Geoff Johns will return to write an episode featuring the Justice Society of America; he previously wrote the episode "Legion", which introduced the Legion of Super-Heroes in season eight. According to Johns, the Justice Society will be a team of superheroes who "started it all-like the Watchmen" and "come out of retirement to give 'the screwed-up guys of the next generation a needed smack down'". Michael Shanks, Brent Stait and Brittney Irvin will be portraying Carter Hall/Hawkman, Kent Nelson/Dr. Fate and Courtney Whitmore/Stargirl respectively in the two-hour episode. Shanks will wear the traditional Hawkman uniform, complete with strap-on wings and Hawkman's mace. Shanks spent time practicing his wirework for the flying scenes he would have to film while in full costume. One difference in the costume is the inclusion of a chest plate. According to Shanks, the costume designers added a chest plate to assist the flying harness they created. The chest plate and Hawkman's helmet were given a bronze color, as opposed to the more traditional "yellow/gold" color. Smallville'''s version of Hawkman uses the backstory that Carter Hall is a "reincarnated prince from a thousand years ago", and worked alongside a group of superheroes in the 1970s. Shanks states that the Justice Society arrives to provide some "tough love" to Clark and his superhero friends, who are reaching a point in their lives where they are trying to find their own destinies. Although they will not appear, Shanks points out that there are references to other Justice Society members throughout the episode. Shanks and Irvin will reprise their Hawkman and Stargirl roles for the season finale.

On November 9, 2009, it was announced that Pam Grier was cast as Amanda Waller, a villainess from DC Comics, for "multiple episodes". Odessa Rae was cast as the villainess Siobhan McDougal, also known as Silver Banshee. Smallvilles McDougal is characterized as a "vengeful spirit of a fallen Gaelic heroine". The tenth episode of season nine featured a "bad guy version" of Green Arrow, known as the "Dark Archer", played by Steve Bacic. Carlo Marks has been cast to play Steven Swift/Warrior Angel, a potential love interest for Chloe. On February 22, 2010, it was announced that Gil Bellows would portray the DC Comics villain Maxwell Lord in at least one episode this season, with the potential for more episodes.

Reception
The season nine premiere, "Savior", pulled in viewership ratings that were the lowest for an original episode in the entire history of the series at the time, with only 2.58 million viewers. Low viewership aside, The CW issued a statement noting that Smallville did outperform every previous show on the network in the Friday 8:00 pm time slot in a year. On January 29, 2010, Smallville returned after a two-month hiatus.

Ken Tucker from Entertainment Weekly said the first hour of the episode "Absolute Justice" contained the "stand-out visual sequence" and thought the second hour was "more lumbering", with the big fight sequence toward the end "unsatisfying". Tucker stated, "For viewers who only know the Superman/boy mythos according to Smallville, it must have seemed strange to have most of the series' ongoing subplots put in storage for this week's two-hour edition. Then again, since the villain of this piece was a faux-hawked foe called the Icicle, frozen plotlines were inevitable." When referring to "Warrior", he called Serinda Swan's portrayal of Zatanna "smart" and said her dialogue with Clark was "crisp" which made Lois’ jealousy understandable.

On March 4, 2010, after The CW announced that Smallville would be back for its tenth season, and it stated that Smallville improved the network's overall Friday performance in the 8:00 pm – 9:00 pm time period by 67% among adults 18–34, 200% in men 18–34, 75% in adults 18–49, 183% in men 18–49 and 74% in total viewers.

Home media release 
The complete ninth season of Smallville was released on September 7, 2010 in North America in both DVD and Blu-ray format. The DVD and Blu-ray box set were also released in region 2 and region 4 on October 25, 2010 and June 22, 2011, respectively. The box set included various special features, including episode commentary, a documentary on the Zod character titled "Kneel Before Zod", and a documentary on how the creative team brought the Justice League to Smallville called "Justice to All".

Notes

References

External links

 
 
 
 List of Smallville season 9 guide at kryptonsite.com

9
2010 American television seasons
2009 American television seasons